Lawrence Scott Coogler (born October 3, 1959) is the Chief United States district judge of the United States District Court for the Northern District of Alabama.

Education and career

Born in Nantucket, Massachusetts, Coogler received a Bachelor of Arts degree from the University of Alabama in 1981 and a Juris Doctor from the University of Alabama School of Law in 1984. From 1982 to 1984 he was a law clerk to attorney David B. Ellis and later to Judge Paul Conger of the Sixth Judicial Circuit Court of Alabama. He was in private practice in Alabama from 1984 to 1999, also serving in the Army National Guard from 1988 to 1991. He was a judge on the Sixth Judicial Circuit Court of Alabama from 1996 to 2003. He was an adjunct professor at the University of Alabama School of Law, from 2000–2003.

District court service

On March 27, 2003, Coogler was nominated by President George W. Bush to a seat on the United States District Court for the Northern District of Alabama vacated by H. Dean Buttram Jr. Coogler was confirmed by the United States Senate on May 22, 2003, and received his commission on May 28, 2003. He became Chief Judge on January 1, 2020.

References

Sources

1959 births
Living people
Judges of the United States District Court for the Northern District of Alabama
United States district court judges appointed by George W. Bush
21st-century American judges
University of Alabama alumni
University of Alabama School of Law alumni
University of Alabama faculty
Alabama state court judges
People from Nantucket, Massachusetts
Alabama National Guard personnel